Ersilia Soudais (born 21 May 1988) is a French politician from La France Insoumise. She was elected as the Member of Parliament for Seine-et-Marne's 7th constituency in the 2022 French legislative election.

References

See also 

 List of deputies of the 16th National Assembly of France

1988 births
Living people
21st-century French politicians
21st-century French women politicians
Deputies of the 16th National Assembly of the French Fifth Republic
La France Insoumise politicians
Women members of the National Assembly (France)
Members of Parliament for Seine-et-Marne
People from Aubervilliers